Lesley Blanch, MBE, FRSL (6 June 1904, London – 7 May 2007, Garavan near Menton, France) was a British writer, historian and traveller. She is best known for The Wilder Shores of Love, about Isabel Burton (who married the Arabist and explorer Richard), Jane Digby el-Mezrab (Lady Ellenborough, the society beauty who ended up living in the Syrian desert with a Bedouin chieftain), Aimée du Buc de Rivéry (a French convent woman captured by pirates and sent to the Sultan's harem in Istanbul), and Isabelle Eberhardt (a Swiss linguist who felt most comfortable in boy's clothes and lived among the Arabs in the Sahara).

Life and career
Blanch attended St. Paul's Girls' School, Hammersmith from 1915 to 1921, went on to study at the Slade School of Art, and began her career as a scenery designer and book illustrator. Between 1937 and 1944 she was features editor of the UK edition of Vogue.

In April 1945, she married the French novelist-diplomat Romain Gary. Life in the French diplomatic service took them to the Balkans, Turkey, North Africa, Mexico and the United States. In the United States, they associated with Aldous Huxley and with Hollywood stars such as Gary Cooper, Sophia Loren and Laurence Olivier.

Gary left her for American actress Jean Seberg. Lesley Blanch and Gary were divorced in 1963. Blanch continued to travel from her home in Paris, and saw old friends Nancy Mitford, Violet Trefusis, Rebecca West and the Windsors. She was a close friend of Gerald de Gaury, who gave her insights into middle eastern customs and culture. The society photographer Cecil Beaton was also a lifelong friend.

The best known of her 12 books is The Wilder Shores of Love (1954), about four women who all "followed the beckoning Eastern star." The book also inspired the American artist Cy Twombly, who named a painting after the novel.

Blanch's love of Russia, instilled in her by a friend of her parents whom she simply called The Traveller, is recounted in Journey into the Mind's Eye, Fragments of an Autobiography (1968, reissued 2018) which is part travel book, part love story. As well as awakening her to sex, he whetted her appetite with exotic tales of Siberia and Central Asia. The Traveller was possibly identified as Theodore Komisarjevsky.

Her trip to Iran and meeting Empress Farah Pahlavi in April 1975 resulted in a biography of the empress named "Farah, Shahbanou of Iran" on 1978

Lesley Blanch considered her best book to be The Sabres of Paradise (the biography of Imam Shamyl and history of Tsarist Russian rule in early 19th century Georgia and the Caucasus).

Awards and honours
A Fellow of the Royal Society of Literature, Lesley Blanch was appointed MBE in 2001, and in 2004 the French government awarded her the medal of Officier de l'Ordre des Arts et des Lettres.

Death
She celebrated her 100th birthday in 2004. She died just one month shy of 103.

Publications
1954: The Wilder Shores of Love London: Phoenix Press | New York: Simon & Schuster 
1955: Round the World in 80 Dishes, the World Through the Kitchen Window (cookbook) London: Grub Street
1957: The Game of Hearts: Harriette Wilson and her Memoirs (edited and introduced by Lesley Blanch)
1957: Harriette Wilson's Memoirs (selected and edited by Lesley Blanch). London: Phoenix Press, 2003
1960: The Sabres of Paradise: Conquest and Vengeance in the Caucasus (a biography of Imam Shamyl and history of Tsarist Russian rule in early 19th century Georgia and the Caucasus), London: BookBlast ePublishing 
1963: Under a Lilac-Bleeding Star, Travels and Travellers
1965: The Nine Tiger Man, a Tale of Low Behaviour in High Places, London: BookBlast ePublishing 
1968: Journey into the Mind's Eye, Fragments of an Autobiography London: Eland Books
1974: Pavilions of the Heart, the Four Walls of Love
1978: Farah, Shahbanou of Iran
1983: Pierre Loti: Portrait of an Escapist
1989: From Wilder Shores, the Tables of my Travels (a collection of travel and food writings)
1998: Romain, un regard particulier; traduit de l'anglais par Jean Lambert. Arles: Actes Sud
2015: On the Wilder Shores of Love: A Bohemian Life London: Virago

References

External links
 
 ILA, translation rights
 Time Traveller, Guardian Online Review Profile article by Joe Boyd, 9 July 2005
 Lesley Blanch Papers. James Marshal and Marie-Louise Osborn Collection, Beinecke Rare Book and Manuscript Library, Yale University.

1904 births
2007 deaths
20th-century English historians
20th-century English memoirists
20th-century English women writers
Alumni of the Slade School of Fine Art
English biographers
English centenarians
English expatriates in France
English journalists
English non-fiction writers
English travel writers
Fellows of the Royal Society of Literature
Members of the Order of the British Empire
Officiers of the Ordre des Arts et des Lettres
People educated at St Paul's Girls' School
Vogue (magazine) people
British women travel writers
British women memoirists
Women centenarians
Historians of Russia